Judith Bishop (born 1972) is a contemporary Australian poet, linguist and translator.

Biography
Judith Bishop was born in Melbourne, Australia in 1972. She holds an MPhil from the University of Cambridge, an MFA in Writing from Washington University in St Louis and a PhD in Linguistics from the University of Melbourne. In 1994 she received the Rae and Edith Bennett Travelling Scholarship for postgraduate study in the United Kingdom. Her MPhil thesis at Cambridge treated the poetry of Yves Bonnefoy.

In addition to her own work, Bishop has an interest in translating French poets, and has published translations of Philippe Jaccottet, René Char and Gérard Macé.

Published works
Interval (UQP, February 2018)
Event (Salt Publishing, 2007). 
Aftermarks (Vagabond Press, 2012).
Alice Missing in Wonderland and other poems (Picaro Press, 2008).

Awards

 Marten Bequest Travelling Scholarship, 2002-2004 
 FAW Anne Elder Award, 2007, winner for Event
 Association for the Study of Australian Literature's Mary Gilmore Prize, 2007, shortlisted for Event
 Judith Wright Calanthe Award for Poetry, 2007, shortlisted for Event 
 Victorian Premier's Awards C. J. Dennis Prize for Poetry, shortlisted for Event
 ABR Poetry Prize, winner 2006, co-winner 2011
 Melbourne Prize for Literature Best Writing Award, Finalist for Interval, 2018 
 NSW Premier's Literary Awards, Kenneth Slessor Prize for Poetry, winner for Interval, 2019

References

External links
  Austlit Literary Database page
  Personal website
  Salt Publishing author page
  Mansour Hosseini: musical setting of a poem, "Reading the Greek Myths"

Living people
Australian poets
1972 births
Australian translators
Australian women poets
Alumni of the University of Cambridge
Washington University in St. Louis alumni
University of Melbourne alumni